Victim(s) or The Victim may refer to:

People
 Crime victim
 Victim, in psychotherapy, a posited role in the Karpman drama triangle model of transactional analysis

Films and television
 The Victim (1916 film), an American silent film by the Fox Film Corporation starring vamp Valeska Suratt
 The Victim (1930 film), an American film starring Esther Howard
 Victim (1961 film), a British drama film featuring Dirk Bogarde
 The Victim (1972 film), an television film produced for American Broadcasting Company
 The Victim (1980 film), a Hong Kong film directed by and starring Sammo Hung
 Victim (1999 film), a Hong Kong film directed by Ringo Lam
 The Victim (2006 film), a Thai horror-thriller film written by Monthon Arayangkoon
 Victim (2010 film), an American indie film directed by Matt Eskandari
 The Victim (2011 film), an American horror film written by and starring Michael Biehn
 The Victim (2012 film), a Konkani theatrical film
 Victims (film), a 1982 American television film
 Victim (2011 film), a British action drama film written by and starring Ashley Chin
 The Victim (2019 TV series), a Scottish miniseries starring Kelly Macdonald and John Hannah
 Victim (web series), a 2022 Indian Tamil-language anthology thriller series

Literature
 The Victim (novel), a 1947 Saul Bellow novel
 Victim: The Other Side of Murder, a 1980 book by Gary Kinder
 The Victim, the American title for Gabriele D'Annunzio's 1892 novel The Intruder
 The Victim, a 1914 novel about Jefferson Davis by Thomas Dixon, Jr.

Music 
 Victim (Belfast band), a punk band originally on Good Vibrations (record label), subsequently based in Manchester
 Victims (band), a hardcore punk/d-beat band from Sweden
 The Victims (Australian band), a punk band from Perth, Western Australia
 Victim (album), 1996 by Gojira
 Victims (Steel Pulse album), 1991
 Victims (Lucky Dube album), 1993
 "Victims" (song), 1983 by Culture Club
 "Victim" (Eighteen Visions song), 2006
 "Victim" (Sevi song), 2012
 "Victim", by Avenged Sevenfold from the album Nightmare, 2010
 "Victim", by Devin Townsend from the album Physicist, 2000
 "Victim", by Esmée Denters from the album Outta Here, 2009
 "Victim", by Kate DeAraugo from the album A Place I've Never Been, 2005
 "Victims", by Lacuna Coil from the album Broken Crown Halo, 2014
 "The Victim", by Juliana Hatfield from the album Juliana's Pony: Total System Failure, 2000
 "The Victim", by Memphis May Fire from the album The Hollow, 2011

Other uses 
 Victim cache, a special cache used in modern microprocessors
 The Victim (racehorse), a competitor in the 1849 Grand National steeplechase

See also

 Victimisation
 Victimology

sr:Жртва